Günther Pospischil (born 21 May 1952) is an Austrian footballer. He played in five matches for the Austria national football team from 1979 to 1980.

References

External links
 

1952 births
Living people
Austrian footballers
Austria international footballers
Place of birth missing (living people)
Association footballers not categorized by position